Joseph Colquhoun Dignam (10 January 1931 – 7 July 1999) was a Scottish professional footballer, who played as an inside forward. He mostly played in the Scottish leagues, although made appearances in the English Football League for Wrexham and in the Northern Irish league for Bangor, and Crusaders.

References

1931 births
1999 deaths
Scottish footballers
Association football forwards
Bathgate Thistle F.C. players
Alloa Athletic F.C. players
Wrexham A.F.C. players
Stirling Albion F.C. players
Bangor F.C. players
Footballers from Glasgow
English Football League players
Crusaders F.C. players